Mohamed Ahmed Zaki Mohamed (born 29 January 1956) is an Egyptian colonel general who has been minister of defense of Egypt since 14 June 2018. Zaki previously held the command for the Egyptian Paratroopers from December 2008 to August 2012 and became the commander of the Republican Guard Forces until June 2018.

He was sworn in on 14 June 2018, succeeding Sedki Sobhy as the minister of defense. He was reportedly appointed as a reward for arresting former Egyptian President Mohamed Morsi during the 2013 Egyptian coup d'état.

References

1956 births
Living people
Defence Ministers of Egypt
2013 Egyptian coup d'état
Egyptian generals
21st-century Egyptian politicians